BAH or Bah may refer to:
 Basic Allowance for Housing, a U.S. military privilege given to many military members
 Bah, a city in Agra district of Uttar Pradesh in India
 Booz Allen Hamilton, an American management and information technology consulting firm, stock ticker BAH
 The Bahamas, IOC country code BAH
 Bahrain, UNDP country code BAH
 Bahrain International Airport, IATA airport code BAH
 Bah (Assembly constituency), in Uttar Pradesh, India
 Bah (surname), including a list of people with that name
 Bahamian Creole, ISO 639-3 language code bah
 BAH domain (bromo-adjacent homology), in molecular biology

See also 
 
 Bah humbug (disambiguation)
 BAHS (disambiguation)
 Bosnia and Herzegovina, a country in Southeastern Europe
 Bahrain, a country in the Persian Gulf
 Bah-Biau Punan language